The Paducah Gaseous Diffusion Plant (PGDP) is a facility located in McCracken County, Kentucky, near Paducah, Kentucky that produced enriched uranium from 1952 to 2013. It is owned by the U.S. Department of Energy (DOE). The PGDP was the only operating uranium enrichment facility in the United States in the period 2001 to 2010. The Paducah plant produced low-enriched uranium, originally as feedstock for military reactors and weapons, and later for commercial nuclear power fuel.

The four process buildings cover , and consumed a peak electrical demand of 3,040 megawatts.

DOE leased the facility to a publicly held company, USEC, from the mid 1990s. USEC ceased operations in 2013 and returned the facility to the Department of Energy for decontamination and decommissioning.

History
The former Kentucky Ordnance Works site was chosen from a candidate list of eight sites in 1950. The construction contractor was F.H. McGraw of Hartford, Connecticut and the operating company was Union Carbide. The plant was opened in 1952 as a government-owned, contractor-operated facility producing enriched uranium to fuel military reactors and for use in nuclear weapons. The mode of enrichment was gaseous diffusion of uranium hexafluoride to separate the lighter fissile isotope U-235 from the heavier non-fissile isotope U-238. 

The Paducah plant produced low-enriched uranium which was further refined at Portsmouth and the K-25 plant at Oak Ridge, Tennessee. From the 1960s the Paducah plant was dedicated to uranium enrichment for nuclear power plants. In 1984, the operating contract was assumed by Martin Marietta Energy Systems. Lockheed Martin operated the plant until USEC leased the facility in the mid 1990s.

The Paducah plant had a capacity of 11.3 million separative work units per year (SWU/year) in 1984. 1812 stages were located in five buildings: C-310 with 60 stages, C-331 with 400 stages, C-333 with 480 stages, C-335 with 400 stages and C-337 with 472 stages.

Before cessation of uranium enrichment on May 31, 2013, the Paducah facility consumed about 3,000 megawatts of electricity. Power for the Paducah gaseous diffusion plant came from the Tennessee Valley Authority (TVA).

Employment and economic impact
During enrichment operations approximately 1200 people were needed to operate the plant. Since cessation of enrichment activities the site employs around 1400 people through contractors to maintain the grounds, portions of the infrastructure, deactivate, optimize utilities and to remediate environmental contamination at the site. The facility has had a positive economic impact on the local economy and continues to be an economic driver for the community. Workers at the plant were represented by the Oil, Chemical and Atomic Workers International Union (OCAW).

Contamination
Plant operations have contaminated the site over time. The primary contamination of concern is trichloroethylene (TCE), which was a commonly used degreaser at the site. TCE leaked and contaminated groundwater on and off the site. The groundwater is also contaminated with trace amounts of technetium-99, a radioactive fission product; Other site contaminants include polychlorinated biphenyl (PCBs). Through normal operations, portions of the plant, primarily process equipment, are contaminated with uranium.

In 1988, TCE and trace amounts of technetium-99 were found in the drinking water wells of residences located near the plant site in McCracken County, Kentucky. To protect human health, the Department of Energy provided city water at no cost to the affected residents, and continues to do so.

Lawsuits
In the 1980s, the family of former employee Joe Harding brought a lawsuit relating to medical conditions that they believed he incurred from having worked at the Paducah plant. His widow Clara Harding eventually settled the suit for $12,000.

In 1998 a lawsuit was brought by employees of the plant against Lockheed Martin, one of the operators of the Paducah plant, relating to falsifying of contamination reports. The Department of Energy later joined this suit.

In 1999 a class action lawsuit was brought against the Paducah plant for former and current employees who believed that they had suffered significant medical expenses because of exposure to ionizing radiation at the plant. The suit was dismissed in 2003 because a judge ruled that the plant was covered by the Price-Anderson Act.

Cleanup status
The Department of Energy continues to remediate groundwater contamination. Significant progress has been made in reducing concentrations of TCE in the groundwater by using pump and treat as well as electrical resistance heating. Twenty five out of over 500 inactive facilities at the site have been demolished. Other site facilities are being deactivated and prepared for demolition. In 2019 314 million dollars was allocated towards the cleanup through an act of legislation.

See also
K-25
Portsmouth Gaseous Diffusion Plant
United States Enrichment Corporation

References

Sources
DOE facts: PADUCAH GASEOUS DIFFUSION PLANT
Global Security.org: Weapons of Mass Destruction-Gas Centrifuge Uranium Enrichment
GAO Report: Preliminary Observations on DOE's Cleanup of the Paducah Uranium Enrichment Plant

External links
 Paducah Gaseous Diffusion Plant at USEC

Buildings and structures in McCracken County, Kentucky
Isotope separation facilities in the United States
Superfund sites in Kentucky
United States Department of Energy facilities
1952 establishments in Kentucky
Industrial buildings and structures in Kentucky
Industrial buildings completed in 1952
2013 disestablishments in Kentucky